Irány Mexikó is a 1968 Hungarian musical film directed by Éva Zsurzs and starring Gyula Bodrogi, Manyi Kiss and Kálmán Latabár.

Main cast
 Gyula Bodrogi ...  Gergely
 Ági Voith ...  Teri
 Kálmán Latabár ...  Csoró
 Kálmán ifj. Latabár ...  Sanyi
 Anikó Felföldi ...  Lenke
 Manyi Kiss ...  Tilda
 Eszter Tamási ... Herself
 Anna Bélaváry ... Soloist
 Mária Patocska ... Soloist
 András Szigeti ... Kerékpáros (as Schwetz András)
 Endre Várhelyi ... Torma Ernő, Teri apja
 István Egri ... TV-s vezető
 Sándor Siménfalvi ... Edzőtábor portása
 Ádám Szirtes ... Rendőr örnagy
 László Nemere
 János Gálcsiki
 László Mezei
 András Kósa ... Fiatal operatör
 Pál Somogyvári
 Györgyi Telessy
 Gedeon Viktor
 János Pagonyi
 István Balázs
 Márta Bakó
 István Nagy
 Mária Toldy ... Herself
 János Koós ... Himself

External links

1968 films
1968 musical comedy films
Hungarian television films
Hungarian musical comedy films
1960s Hungarian-language films
Films directed by Éva Zsurzs